"Trying to Stop Your Leaving" is a song co-written and recorded by American country music artist Dierks Bentley. It was released in January 2008 as the fourth and final single from his 2006 album Long Trip Alone. It peaked at number 5 on the U.S. Billboard Hot Country Songs chart and at number 73 on the U.S. Billboard Hot 100 chart. The song was written by Bentley, Brett Beavers and Jim Beavers.

Content
The narrator is a man who is describing his difficulty in trying to keep his lover from leaving him. He uses various metaphors to illustrate his point. For example, in one verse, he compares the situation to throwing a pebble into the Rio Grande, stating that he could "throw in a million more and not slow it down".

Critical reception
Kevin John Coyne of Country Universe gave the song an A− grade, saying that he liked the "rise and fall in intensity, [and] the delicate intertwining of the electric guitar and the steel." In 2017, Billboard contributor Chuck Dauphin put "Trying to Stop Your Leaving" at number two on his top 10 list of Bentley's best songs.

Music video
The music video was directed by Trey Fanjoy, and features Bentley standing by a river, and him and his band playing in the middle of a railroad track in a tunnel. It also features Bentley and his (only in the video) wife fighting and her packing her bags. It also shows them having sexual activity.

Chart performance
"Trying to Stop Your Leaving" debuted at number 57 on the U.S. Billboard Hot Country Songs chart for the week of January 26, 2008.

Year-end charts

References

2008 singles
2006 songs
Country ballads
2000s ballads
Dierks Bentley songs
Music videos directed by Trey Fanjoy
Songs written by Dierks Bentley
Songs written by Brett Beavers
Songs written by Jim Beavers
Capitol Records Nashville singles
Song recordings produced by Brett Beavers